Stericta kiiensis is a species of snout moth. It is found in Japan.

The wingspan is 18–21 mm.

References

Moths described in 1921
Epipaschiinae
Moths of Japan